Rafael Rocha may refer to:

 Rafael Rocha (swimmer) (born 1956), Mexican swimmer
 Rafael Rocha (footballer) (born 1989), Brazilian footballer